Anesius is one of several Christian martyrs in Africa commemorated as saints on March 31. The Martyrologium Romanum mentions Anesius, Theodulus, and Cornelia. All mentioned saints were canonized pre-congregation. Other sources, including Commentarium Historicum ad Universum Romanum Martyrologium, includes other names including Felix, Portus, Abdas (or Abda), and Valeria.

See also 
 Scillitan Martyrs

References

Sources
 Holweck, F. G. A Biographical Dictionary of the Saints. St. Louis, MO: B. Herder Book Co., 1924.

Year of birth unknown
Year of death unknown
Ante-Nicene Christian martyrs
Christian saints in unknown century
Saints from Roman Africa (province)